Feetu Knihti (born 16 March 2003) is a Finnish ice hockey player who currently plays for Porin Ässät in Liiga. He mainly plays in the U20 team. He made his Liiga debut in 17 September 2021 in a game against HPK.

Career 
In September 2021 Feetu Knihti signed a three-year contract with Ässät along with Kalle Myllymaa and Eemeli Virtanen.

Knihti made his Liiga debut on 17 September in a game against HPK.

Sources 

Living people
2003 births
Ässät players
Finnish ice hockey centres
People from Eura